The Women's 5000 metres race of the 2016 World Single Distances Speed Skating Championships was held on 12 February 2016.

Results
The race was started at 19:05.

References

Women's 5000 metres
World